Svein Magnus Furu (born 10 November 1983) is a Norwegian Jazz musician (saxophone) composer and music journalist, known from several bands and album releases.

Career 
Furu was born in Asker and is a graduate of the Norwegian Academy of Music in Oslo, where he studied under musicians like Fredrik Ljungkvist, Morten Halle and Ivar Grydeland. He has collaborated on venues all over Europe and USA, within a series of bands like Aphrodisiac, Speakeasy, Stian Around a Hill Quartet, Andrea Kvartett, Trabant and Diplodokus. He has also played on the biggest Norwegian jazz festivals, such as Oslo Jazzfestival, Kongsberg Jazzfestival, Nattjazz and MaiJazz, in addition to the 'Turku Jazz Festival' in Finland. He was nominated for Spellemannprisen 2009 in the class Jazz, together with Kim Johannesen and Tore Sandbakken for the album Kayak. He has participated in JazzIntro competition 'Young jazz musicians of the year', with three bands, and the 'Young Nordic Jazz Comets' within the band Speakeasy in 2010.

Furu is also a music journalist and critique for the renowned Norwegian newspaper Morgenbladet and Norwegian Broadcasting NRK.

Discography

Solo albums 
2009: The Eco Logic (Creative Sources Recordings), duo with guitarist Kim Johannesen
2009: Kayak (AIM Sound City), trio including Kim Johannesen and Tore Sandbakken

Collaborations 
With Stian Around a Hill Quartet
2009: Lille Stille (AIM Sound City)
2011: Alle Skal Få  (Atterklang)

With Aphrodisiac
2010: Yearning (Park Grammofon)

With Andrea Kvartett
2012: Andrea Kvintett (NorCD)
2013: Russian Dream (EP) (NorCD)

With Schow Trio including John Vegard Schow (piano), Sebastian Haugen-Markussen (bass) and Ole-Andreas Olafsrud (drums)
2013: Blått Hjerte (Pilar Records)

References

External links 

Norwegian journalists
Norwegian jazz saxophonists
Avant-garde jazz musicians
Norwegian jazz composers
Norwegian Academy of Music alumni
Musicians from Asker
Musicians from Oslo
Norwegian music journalists
1983 births
Living people
21st-century saxophonists